The 1893 Princeton Tigers football team represented Princeton University in the 1893 college football season. The team finished with an 11–0 record and was retroactively named as the national champion by the Billingsley Report, Helms Athletic Foundation, Houlgate System, and National Championship Foundation. They outscored their opponents 270 to 14.

As the Princeton and Yale teams prepared to meet in late November 1893, an unprecedented amount of media and public attention fell upon the big game, which was being billed as the championship game of the season. Both teams entered the game with undefeated with records of 10–0. Yale had outscored its opponents 336–6 and was riding a 37-game winning streak dating back to a loss to Harvard in 1890. Princeton had outscored its opponents by a cumulative total of 264–14, and was seeking to avenge its 12–0 loss to Yale the previous year. A crowd of 40,000, the largest ever to see a football game up to that time, showed up at the Polo Grounds in New York to see the two teams take the field. Three-time consensus All-American Philip King led Princeton into the game. He would later head the Princeton Football Association and help coach. King had just developed the double wingback formation with the ends deployed on the wings of the line.

From the double wingback formation, Princeton precisely executed a complete set of plays and completely befuddled the Yale eleven, captained by College Football Hall of Famer Frank Hinkey. The New York Sun noted that "Princeton in 1893 had the finest offensive machine it had developed up to this time – a team with continuity of attack, the ability to pile first down upon first down." Princeton was able to cross the goal once and held Yale scoreless, thus winning 6-0 and claiming the national championship.

However, the game did not pass without engendering some controversy. The New York Herald declared in a scathing commentary: "Thanksgiving Day is no longer a solemn festival to God for mercies given. It is a holiday granted by the State and the Nation to see a game of football. The kicker now is king and the people bow down to him. The gory nosed tackler, hero of a hundred scrimmages and half as many wrecked wedges, is the idol of the hour. With swollen face and bleeding head, daubed from crown to sole with the mud of Manhattan Field, he stands triumphant amid the cheers of thousands. What matters that the purpose of the day is perverted, that church is foregone, that family reunion is neglected, that dinner is delayed if not forgot. Has not Princeton played a mighty game with Yale and has not Princeton won? This is the modern Thanksgiving Day."

The Yale-Princeton Thanksgiving Day game of 1893 earned $13,000 for each school from gate receipts, as the big games became the primary source of revenue for the college's athletic programs.  Despite the loss, Yale was retroactively named champion by Parke H. Davis, and the NCAA Division I Football Records Book lists both Princeton and Yale as national champions.

Schedule

References

Princeton
Princeton Tigers football seasons
College football national champions
College football undefeated seasons
Princeton Tigers football